Andrija Stane Krstulović (17 October 1929 – 14 April 2012) was a Croatian footballer and manager who played as a centre-forward or centre-back and made one appearance for the Croatia national team.

International career
Krstulović earned his first and only cap for Croatia in the team's 1956 friendly match against Indonesia. The fixture, which was played on 12 September in Zagreb, finished as a 5–2 win for Croatia.

Personal life
Krstulović died in a traffic collision on 14 April 2012 in Split at the age of 82.

Career statistics

International

International goals

References

External links
 
 
 Stane Krstulović at 11v11.com

1929 births
2012 deaths
Footballers from Split, Croatia
Association football forwards
Association football central defenders
Yugoslav footballers
Croatian footballers
Croatia international footballers
HNK Hajduk Split players
RNK Split players
Yugoslav First League players
Yugoslav football managers
RNK Split managers
Road incident deaths in Croatia
Burials at Lovrinac Cemetery